Xinglongxian West railway station is a railway station of Beijing-Shenyang high-speed railway located in Xinglong County, Chengde, Hebei Province, People's Republic of China. It was opened on 22 January 2021.

References

Railway stations in Hebei
Stations on the Beijing–Harbin High-Speed Railway
Railway stations in China opened in 2021